Grayston ‘Bill’ Ives (born 1948) is a British composer, singer and choral director.

Until March 2009, Ives was Organist, Informator Choristarum and Fellow and Tutor in Music at Magdalen College, Oxford. In this role he was responsible for the daily musical life of the college chapel. He also directed the choir in recordings on the Harmonia Mundi label: With a Merrie Noyse, made with the viol consort Fretwork and featuring the works of the English composer Orlando Gibbons, was nominated for a Grammy in 2004. Paul McCartney's Ecce Cor Meum was written especially for Magdalen College Choir and the subsequent EMI recording won the Classical BRIT Award for Album of the Year in 2007. Other recordings with Magdalen College Choir include Listen Sweet Dove, a selection of Grayston Ives' liturgical works,  and Duruflé's Requiem. The choir developed a fruitful relationship with film composer, George Fenton, notably in Shadowlands (1993), directed by Richard Attenborough.

Ives was a chorister at Ely Cathedral and later studied music at Selwyn College, Cambridge, where he held a choral scholarship. After teaching music for a period, he became a member of the King's Singers, from 1978 to 1985. His voice can be heard on a number of recordings from that period, including Paul McCartney's Frog Chorus. Ives composes as Grayston, but prefers to be known as "Bill", a nickname he acquired at an early age as a result of a role-playing game with his brother.

As a composer, Ives' work consists mainly of sacred and secular music for choir, much of it written for the liturgy at Magdalen College, Oxford. His "Canterbury Te Deum" (1991) for SATB and brass quintet was commissioned for the enthronement of George Carey as Archbishop of Canterbury. He was commissioned to compose the centre-piece anthem, "The Gift of Grace", for the National Commemoration Service for the Abolition of Slavery held in Westminster Abbey in March 2007.  It was attended by Queen Elizabeth II and high-ranking politicians and public figures, including Tony Blair (British Prime Minister, 1997–2007). Westminster Abbey also commissioned three new arrangements of music by Parry for a new recording (released in Sept 2015): I was glad, Hear my words, ye people, and the Coronation Te Deum.

For his contribution to church music, Ives was awarded a Fellowship of the Royal School of Church Music (May 2008) and a Lambeth DMus (July 2008), conferred by Rowan Williams,  Archbishop of Canterbury. He is also an Emeritus Fellow of Magdalen College, Oxford.

Choral works
Canticles and Service Music
Canterbury Te Deum
Missa Brevis (1987, for the choir of New College, Oxford)
The Edington Service
The Exon Service
The Magdalen Service (ATB)
The Salisbury Service
The Warwick Service
Jubilate
Preces and Responses (SATB and ATB)
Anthems (SATB)
A Song of Christ's Glory
A Song of Divine Love
Lord, is it I?
Listen sweet Dove (for Whitsun)
Nova, nova
Let all the world
Nos autem gloriari
O Sacrum Convivium
Sicut lilium
Sweet was the song
The Canticle of Brother Sun
There is a land of pure delight
This is the record of John
Ubi caritas
The Beatitudes (girls' voices, for the 10th anniversary of Derby Cathedral Girls' Choir)
Ave Maria (SATB)
All People that on Earth do dwell (for patronal festival of St Matthews, Northampton, 2018)
Three Latin Motets (ATB)
Arrangements
I've got you under my skin
Name that tune
Rise up, shepherd
Three Spirituals
Amazing Grace
Deep River
Were you there?
Three folksongs
Buy broom besoms
The lark in the clear air
The tailor and the mouse

Organ solo
Intrada
Processional
Lullaby
Partita on "Hursley"

References

External links
Official website
Biography on King's Singers fansite

Living people
1948 births
20th-century classical composers
Alumni of Selwyn College, Cambridge
English classical composers
The King's Singers members
English male classical composers
20th-century English composers
20th-century British male musicians